Gnophos is a genus in the geometer moth family (Geometridae). A mostly Old World lineage, it is abundant in the Palearctic, with some North American species as well; in Europe six species are recorded. This genus has about 120 known species altogether in several recognized subgenera, with new ones still being discovered occasionally.

This is the type genus of the tribe Gnophini in subfamily Ennominae, which some authors include in the Boarmiini.

Selected species
Subgenera and species of Gnophos include:

Some other species formerly placed here are now in related genera such as Charissa, Ortaliella and Stueningia

Footnotes

References

  (2011): Gnophos. Version 2.4, 27 January 2011. Retrieved 21 April 2011.
  (2004): Butterflies and Moths of the World, Generic Names and their Type-species – Catascia. Version of 5 November 2004. Retrieved 21 April 2011.
  (2004b): Butterflies and Moths of the World, Generic Names and their Type-species – Gnophos. Version of 5 November 2004. Retrieved 21 April 2011.
  (2009): Lepidoptera and Some Other Life Forms – Gnophos. Version of 22 May 2009. Retrieved 21 April 2011.

Ennominae